The Rathaus Spandau is the town hall of the borough of Spandau in the western suburbs of Berlin, the capital city of Germany. It was designed by Heinrich Reinhardt and Georg Süßenguth, and was built between 1910 and 1913. Until 1920, when Spandau was incorporated into Greater Berlin, it was the city hall of the independent city of Spandau.

The Rathaus Spandau is situated on Carl-Schurz-Straße at the southern edge of the Altstadt Spandau. The Rathaus Spandau station, on U-Bahn line , and the Berlin-Spandau station, served by S-Bahn, regional and intercity railway routes, are both situated nearby.

References

Buildings and structures in Spandau
City and town halls in Germany